Janina Dłuska (born 1899 Kursk – 8 June 1932 Vilnius) was a Russian Empire-born Polish artist, painter, nurse, and aviator.

Biography 
Janina Dłuska was born in 1899 in Kursk, Russian Empire (present-day Russia). She graduated from the Moscow School of Painting, Sculpture and Architecture. In 1919 she returned to Poland, and during the Polish-Soviet war, she served as a nurse in the Voluntary Legion of Women . After the war, she worked as a drawing teacher at the women's teachers' college in Lublin.

In 1922, she moved to Munich, where she studied at the Academy of Fine Arts, Munich for 3 years, then studied in Paris. She specialized in portrait watercolor. She worked for magazines such as Vogue or Die Dame.

In 1931, she returned to Vilnius. She became interested in aviation, active in the Vilnius Aeroclub. She completed a pilot course and was to begin practical glider training, but on 8 June 1932, she died in a plane crash.

Family 
Her sister was Maria Dłuska, a linguist from the Jagiellonian University . In 1954, Maria Dłuska donated a part of her sister's artistic legacy to the National Museum, Krakow.

References

Further reading 

 Marian Romeyko : In Honor of Fallen Aviators Memorial Book . Warsaw: Publishing House of the Committee for the Construction of the Monument to the Fallen Airmen, 1933, p. 375

1899 births
1932 deaths
People from Kursk Oblast
Polish artists
Polish aviators
Women aviators
Polish women artists
Polish nurses
Moscow School of Painting, Sculpture and Architecture alumni
Academy of Fine Arts, Munich alumni